Grape Creek is a census-designated place (CDP) in Tom Green County, Texas, United States. It is part of the San Angelo, Texas Metropolitan Statistical Area. The population of Grape Creek was 3,154 at the 2010 census.

Geography
Grape Creek is located at  (31.581679, -100.547371). According to the United States Census Bureau in 2000, the CDP has a total area of 17.2 square miles (44.6 km), all of it land.

History
Grape Creek CDP is on Grape Creek just north of U.S. Highway 87 and the Gulf, Colorado and Santa Fe Railway in north central Tom Green County.  The area was populated as early as 1858, when the Butterfield Overland Mail established a Grape Creek station on the east bank of the east fork of Grape Creek near the present-day community.   The community was founded before 1900. In 1901, the community had a school for 26 pupils and one teacher, and by 1934, it had three elementary schools and a high school. State highway maps in 1936 showed the school, a church, a nearby cemetery, and scattered dwellings in the community. By the 1980s, the Grape Creek-Pulliam School was in operation, and the area had become the site of a new subdivision known as Grape Creek Community.

Demographics

2020 census

As of the 2020 United States census, there were 3,594 people, 1,163 households, and 793 families residing in the CDP.

2000 census
As of the census of 2000, 3,138 people, 1,124 households, and 892 families resided in the CDP. The population density was 182.3 people per square mile (70.4/km). There were 1,219 housing units at an average density of 70.8 per square mile (27.3/km). The racial makeup of the CDP was 91.78% White, 0.41% African American, 0.76% Native American, 0.10% Asian, 0.03% Pacific Islander, 4.84% from other races, and 2.07% from two or more races. Hispanics or Latinos of any race were 15.77% of the population.

Of the 1,124 households, 38.9% had children under the age of 18 living with them, 64.4% were married couples living together, 11.1% had a female householder with no husband present, and 20.6% were not families. About 17.2% of all households were made up of individuals, and 6.0% had someone living alone who was 65 years of age or older. The average household size was 2.79 and the average family size was 3.14.

In the CDP, the population was distributed as 28.8% under the age of 18, 8.1% from 18 to 24, 27.3% from 25 to 44, 25.2% from 45 to 64, and 10.5% who were 65 years of age or older. The median age was 36 years. For every 100 females, there were 97.2 males. For every 100 females age 18 and over, there were 95.2 males.

The median income for a household in the CDP was $35,046, and for a family was $38,413. Males had a median income of $30,931 versus $19,957 for females. The per capita income for the CDP was $14,806. About 15.0% of families and 15.5% of the population were below the poverty line, including 19.6% of those under age 18 and 15.1% of those age 65 or over.

Education
Public education in the community of Grape Creek is provided by the Grape Creek Independent School District and home to the Grape Creek High School Eagles.

Footnotes
1 Texas Almanac 2008-2009 Butterfield Overland Mail in Texas entry
2 Handbook of Texas Online Grape Creek entry

References

Census-designated places in Tom Green County, Texas
Census-designated places in Texas
San Angelo, Texas metropolitan area